The 2019 Estoril Open (also known as the Millennium Estoril Open for sponsorship purposes) was a professional men's tennis tournament played on outdoor clay courts. It was the fifth edition of the Estoril Open, and part of the ATP Tour 250 series of the 2019 ATP Tour. The event took place at the Clube de Ténis do Estoril in Cascais, Portugal, from April 29 through May 5, 2019.

Singles main draw entrants

Seeds

 Rankings are as of April 22, 2019.

Other entrants
The following players received wildcards into the singles main draw:
  Pablo Carreño Busta
  David Goffin
  Pedro Sousa

The following player received entry as a special exempt:
  Filip Krajinović

The following players received entry from the qualifying draw:
  Salvatore Caruso
  Alejandro Davidovich Fokina
  João Domingues
  Alexei Popyrin

The following players received entry as lucky losers:
  Filippo Baldi
  Pablo Cuevas

Withdrawals
  Kevin Anderson → replaced by  Hugo Dellien
  Filip Krajinović → replaced by  Pablo Cuevas
  Fabio Fognini → replaced by  Filippo Baldi
  Jaume Munar → replaced by  Nicolás Jarry
  Cameron Norrie → replaced by  Guido Andreozzi

Retirements
  John Millman

Doubles main draw entrants

Seeds

 Rankings are as of April 22, 2019.

Other entrants
The following pairs received wildcards into the doubles main draw:
  João Domingues /  Pedro Martínez
  Gastão Elias /  Pedro Sousa

The following pairs received entry as alternates:
  Guido Andreozzi /  Hugo Dellien
  Tiago Cação /  Fred Gil

Withdrawals
Before the tournament
  John Millman (Left foot injury)
  Pedro Sousa (Left foot injury)
During the tournament
  Reilly Opelka (Back pain)

Champions

Singles

  Stefanos Tsitsipas def.  Pablo Cuevas, 6–3, 7–6(7–4)

Doubles

  Jérémy Chardy /  Fabrice Martin def.  Luke Bambridge /  Jonny O'Mara, 7–5, 7–6(7–3)

References

External links
 Official website